The University of Nebraska Cornhusker Marching Band (also known as the Marching Red or The Pride of All Nebraska) is the marching band of the University of Nebraska and is part of the Glenn Korff School of Music within the Hixson–Lied College of Fine and Performing Arts. The band consists of 300 students from over 60 different academic majors from across the campus. It performs at all home football games, seen by millions of people each year in Memorial Stadium and on television.

History
Founded in 1879, the Marching Red is one of the oldest and best-known collegiate marching bands in the United States.

Thanks to the success of the Husker football program, it is also one of the most traveled bands in the country having performed at many post-season bowl games.  The band has appeared multiple times at the Rose, Fiesta, Orange, Sugar, Cotton, Sun, and Alamo Bowls. It has also made single appearances at the Bluebonnet, Liberty, Holiday, Citrus, Independence, and Gator Bowls.

In 1993, the Marching Red appeared on the Kennedy Center stage as part of the Kennedy Center Honors ceremony.

The Cornhusker Marching Band has toured internationally, visiting continental Europe and Ireland. It has received many honors and awards including the John Philip Sousa Foundation's Sudler Trophy in 1996.

In 2005 the band was featured on the NBC prime time series Tommy Lee Goes to College and in 2007 on ABC's Extreme Makeover: Home Edition.

On October 13, 2007, a film crew from the comedy film, Yes Man, filmed portions of the movie at Memorial Stadium including several shots of the marching band.

On November 19, 2011, the Cornhusker Marching Band performed at Michigan Stadium in front of the largest audience ever to watch the band.

Auditions

To become a member, each person must pass a music audition in the Spring or attend a mini camp as is the case sometimes for percussion and color guard. After first cuts, a second marching and music memorization audition follows in the Fall semester.

References

External links
 

Big Ten Conference marching bands
Cornhusker Marching Band
1879 establishments in Nebraska
Musical groups from Nebraska
Musical groups established in 1879